900 (nine hundred) is the natural number following 899 and preceding 901. It is the square of 30 and the sum of Euler's totient function for the first 54 positive integers. In base 10 it is a Harshad number. It is also the first number to be the square of a sphenic number.

In other fields
900 is also:

 A telephone area code for "premium" phone calls in the North American Numbering Plan
 In Greek number symbols, the sign Sampi ("ϡ", literally "like a pi")
 A skateboarding trick in which the skateboarder spins two and a half times (360 degrees times 2.5 is 900)
 A 900 series refers to three consecutive perfect games in bowling
 Yoda's age in Star Wars

Integers from 901 to 999

900s
 901 = 17 × 53, centered triangular number, happy number
 902 = 2 × 11 × 41, sphenic number, nontotient, Harshad number
 903 = 3 × 7 × 43, sphenic number, triangular number, Schröder–Hipparchus number, Mertens function (903) returns 0, little Schroeder number
 904 = 23 × 113 or 113 × 8, refactorable number, Mertens function(904) returns 0, lazy caterer number, number of 1's in all partitions of 26 into odd parts
 905 = 5 × 181, sum of seven consecutive primes (109 + 113 + 127 + 131 + 137 + 139 + 149), smallest composite de Polignac number
 "The 905" is a common nickname for the suburban portions of the Greater Toronto Area in Canada, a region whose telephones used area code 905 before overlay plans added two more area codes.
 906 = 2 × 3 × 151, strobogrammatic, sphenic number, Mertens function(906) returns 0
 907 = prime number
 908 = 22 × 227, nontotient, number of primitive sorting networks on 6 elements, number of rhombic tilings of a 12-gon 
 909 = 32 × 101, number of non-isomorphic aperiodic multiset partitions of weight 7

910s
 910 = 2 × 5 × 7 × 13, Mertens function(910) returns 0, Harshad number, happy number, balanced number, number of polynomial symmetric functions of matrix of order 7 under separate row and column permutations
 911 = Sophie Germain prime number, also the emergency telephone number in North America
 912 = 24 × 3 × 19, sum of four consecutive primes (223 + 227 + 229 + 233), sum of ten consecutive primes (71 + 73 + 79 + 83 + 89 + 97 + 101 + 103 + 107 + 109), Harshad number. 
 913 = 11 × 83, Smith number, Mertens function(913) returns 0. 
 914 = 2 × 457, nontotient, number of compositions of 11 that are neither weakly increasing nor weakly decreasing 
 915 = 3 × 5 × 61, sphenic number, Smith number, Mertens function(915) returns 0, Harshad number
 916 = 22 × 229, Mertens function(916) returns 0, nontotient, strobogrammatic, member of the Mian–Chowla sequence
 917 = 7 × 131, sum of five consecutive primes (173 + 179 + 181 + 191 + 193)
 918 = 2 × 33 × 17, Harshad number
 919 = prime number, cuban prime, prime index prime, Chen prime, palindromic prime, centered hexagonal number, Mertens function(919) returns 0

920s
 920 = 23 × 5 × 23, Mertens function(920) returns 0, total number of nodes in all rooted trees with 8 nodes 
 921 = 3 × 307, number of enriched r-trees of size 7 
 922 = 2 × 461, nontotient, Smith number
 923 = 13 × 71, number of combinations of 6 things from 1 to 6 at a time 
 924 = 22 × 3 × 7 × 11, sum of a twin prime (461 + 463), central binomial coefficient 
 925 = 52 × 37, pentagonal number, centered square number
 The millesimal fineness number for Sterling silver
 926 = 2 × 463, sum of six consecutive primes (139 + 149 + 151 + 157 + 163 + 167), nontotient
 927 = 32 × 103, tribonacci number
 928 = 25 × 29, sum of four consecutive primes (227 + 229 + 233 + 239), sum of eight consecutive primes (101 + 103 + 107 + 109 + 113 + 127 + 131 + 137), happy number
 929 = prime number, Proth prime, palindromic prime, sum of nine consecutive primes (83 + 89 + 97 + 101 + 103 + 107 + 109 + 113 + 127), Eisenstein prime with no imaginary part
 An area code in New York.

930s
 930 = 2 × 3 × 5 × 31, pronic number
 931 = 72 × 19; sum of three consecutive primes (307 + 311 + 313); double repdigit, 11130 and 77711; number of regular simple graphs spanning 7 vertices 
 932 = 22 × 233, number of regular simple graphs on 7 labeled nodes 
 933 = 3 × 311
 934 = 2 × 467, nontotient
 935 = 5 × 11 × 17, sphenic number, Lucas–Carmichael number, Harshad number
 936 = 23 × 32 × 13, pentagonal pyramidal number, Harshad number
 937 = prime number, Chen prime, star number, happy number
 938 = 2 × 7 × 67, sphenic number, nontotient, number of lines through at least 2 points of an 8 × 8 grid of points 
 939 = 3 × 313, number of V-toothpicks after 31 rounds of the honeycomb sequence

940s
 940 = 22 × 5 × 47, totient sum for first 55 integers
 941 = prime number, sum of three consecutive primes (311 + 313 + 317), sum of five consecutive primes (179 + 181 + 191 + 193 + 197), Chen prime, Eisenstein prime with no imaginary part
 942 = 2 × 3 × 157, sphenic number, sum of four consecutive primes (229 + 233 + 239 + 241), nontotient, convolved Fibonacci number 
 943 = 23 × 41
 944 = 24 × 59, nontotient, Lehmer-Comtet number
 945 = 33 × 5 × 7, double factorial of 9, smallest odd abundant number (divisors less than itself add up to 975); smallest odd primitive abundant number; smallest odd primitive semiperfect number; Leyland number
 946 = 2 × 11 × 43, sphenic number, triangular number, hexagonal number, happy number
 947 = prime number, sum of seven consecutive primes (113 + 127 + 131 + 137 + 139 + 149 + 151), balanced prime, Chen prime, lazy caterer number, Eisenstein prime with no imaginary part
 948 = 22 × 3 × 79, nontotient, forms a Ruth–Aaron pair with 949 under second definition, number of combinatory separations of normal multisets of weight 6.
 949 = 13 × 73, forms a Ruth–Aaron pair with 948 under second definition

950s
 950 = 2 × 52 × 19, nontotient, generalized pentagonal number
 one of two ISBN Group Identifiers for books published in Argentina
 951 = 3 × 317, centered pentagonal number
 one of two ISBN Group Identifiers for books published in Finland
 952 = 23 × 7 × 17, number of reduced words of length 3 in the Weyl group D_17, number of regions in regular tetradecagon with all diagonals drawn. 
 952 is also 9-5-2, a card game similar to bridge.
 one of two ISBN Group Identifiers for books published in Finland
 953 = prime number, Sophie Germain prime, Chen prime, Eisenstein prime with no imaginary part, centered heptagonal number
 ISBN Group Identifier for books published in Croatia
 954 = 2 × 32 × 53, sum of ten consecutive primes (73 + 79 + 83 + 89 + 97 + 101 + 103 + 107 + 109 + 113), nontotient, Harshad number, sixth derivative of x^(x^x) at x=1.
 ISBN Group Identifier for books published in Bulgaria. Also one of the Area Codes in the South Florida Area
 955 = 5 × 191, number of transitive rooted trees with 17 nodes
 ISBN Group Identifier for books published in Sri Lanka
 956 = 22 × 239, 		number of compositions of 13 into powers of 2.
 ISBN Group Identifier for books published in Chile
 957 = 3 × 11 × 29, sphenic number, antisigma(45)
 one of two ISBN Group Identifiers for books published in Taiwan and China
 958 = 2 × 479, nontotient, Smith number
 ISBN Group Identifier for books published in Colombia
 The millesimal fineness number for Britannia silver
 959 = 7 × 137, composite de Polignac number
 ISBN Group Identifier for books published in Cuba

960s
 960 = 26 × 3 × 5, sum of six consecutive primes (149 + 151 + 157 + 163 + 167 + 173), Harshad number
 country calling code for Maldives, ISBN Group Identifier for books published in Greece
 The number of possible starting positions for the chess variant Chess960
 961 = 312, the largest 3-digit perfect square, sum of three consecutive primes (313 + 317 + 331), sum of five consecutive primes (181 + 191 + 193 + 197 + 199), centered octagonal number
 country calling code for Lebanon, ISBN Group Identifier for books published in Slovenia
 962 = 2 × 13 × 37, sphenic number, nontotient
 country calling code for Jordan, one of two ISBN Group Identifiers for books published in Hong Kong
 963 = 32 × 107, sum of the first twenty-four primes
 country calling code for Syria, ISBN Group Identifier for books published in Hungary
 964 = 22 × 241, sum of four consecutive primes (233 + 239 + 241 + 251), nontotient, totient sum for first 56 integers
 country calling code for Iraq, ISBN Group Identifier for books published in Iran, happy number
 965 = 5 × 193
 country calling code for Kuwait, ISBN Group Identifier for books published in Israel
 966 = 2 × 3 × 7 × 23 = , sum of eight consecutive primes (103 + 107 + 109 + 113 + 127 + 131 + 137 + 139), Harshad number
 country calling code for Saudi Arabia, one of two ISBN Group Identifiers for books published in Ukraine
 967 = prime number, prime index prime
 country calling code for Yemen, one of two ISBN Group Identifiers for books published in Malaysia
 968 = 23 × 112, nontotient, Achilles number, area of a square with diagonal 44
 country calling code for Oman, one of two ISBN Group Identifiers for books published in Mexico
 969 = 3 × 17 × 19, sphenic number, nonagonal number, tetrahedral number
 ISBN Group Identifier for books published in Pakistan, age of Methuselah according to Old Testament, anti-Muslim movement in Myanmar

970s
 970 = 2 × 5 × 97, sphenic number, heptagonal number
 country calling code for Palestinian territories, one of two ISBN Group Identifiers for books published in Mexico
 971 = prime number, Chen prime, Eisenstein prime with no imaginary part
 country calling code for United Arab Emirates, ISBN Group Identifier for books published in the Philippines
 972 = 22 × 35, Harshad number, Achilles number
 country calling code for Israel, one of two ISBN Group Identifiers for books published in Portugal
 973 = 7 × 139, happy number
 country calling code for Bahrain, ISBN Group Identifier for books published in Romania, 
 974 = 2 × 487, nontotient, 974! - 1 is prime
 country calling code for Qatar, ISBN Group Identifier for books published in Thailand
 975 = 3 × 52 × 13
 country calling code for Bhutan, ISBN Group Identifier for books published in Turkey
 976 = 24 × 61, decagonal number
 country calling code for Mongolia, ISBN Group Identifier for books published in Antigua, Bahamas, Barbados, Belize, Cayman Islands, Dominica, Grenada, Guyana, Jamaica, Montserrat, Saint Kitts and Nevis, St. Lucia, St. Vincent and the Grenadines, Trinidad and Tobago, and the British Virgin Islands
 977 = prime number, sum of nine consecutive primes (89 + 97 + 101 + 103 + 107 + 109 + 113 + 127 + 131), balanced prime, Chen prime, Eisenstein prime with no imaginary part, Stern prime, strictly non-palindromic number
 country calling code for Nepal
 EAN prefix for ISSNs
 ISBN Group Identifier for books published in Egypt
 978 = 2 × 3 × 163, sphenic number, nontotient, number of secondary structures of RNA molecules with 11 nucleotides
 First EAN prefix for ISBNs
 ISBN Group Identifier for books published in Nigeria
 979 = 11 × 89, the sum of the five smallest fourth powers: 
 Second EAN prefix for ISBNs. Also for ISMNs
 ISBN Group Identifier for books published in Indonesia

980s
 980 = 22 × 5 × 72, number of ways to tile a hexagon of edge 3 with calissons of side 1.
 ISBN Group Identifier for books published in Venezuela
 981 = 32 × 109
 one of two ISBN Group Identifiers for books published in Singapore
 982 = 2 × 491, happy number
 ISBN Group Identifier for books published in the Cook Islands, Fiji, Kiribati, Marshall Islands, Micronesia, Nauru, New Caledonia, Niue, Palau, Solomon Islands, Tokelau, Tonga, Tuvalu, Vanuatu, Western Samoa
 983 = prime number, safe prime, Chen prime, Eisenstein prime with no imaginary part, Wedderburn–Etherington number, strictly non-palindromic number
 One of two ISBN Group Identifiers for books published in Malaysia
 984 = 23 × 3 × 41
 ISBN Group Identifier for books published in Bangladesh
 985 = 5 × 197, sum of three consecutive primes (317 + 331 + 337), Markov number, Pell number, Smith number
 one of two ISBN Group Identifiers for books published in Belarus
 986 = 2 × 17 × 29, sphenic number, nontotient, strobogrammatic, number of unimodal compositions of 14 where the maximal part appears once
 one of two ISBN Group Identifiers for books published in Taiwan and China
 987 = 3 × 7 × 47, sphenic number, Fibonacci number, number of partitions of 52 into prime parts
 one of two ISBN Group Identifiers for books published in Argentina
 988 = 22 × 13 × 19, nontotient. sum of four consecutive primes (239 + 241 + 251 + 257). A cake number.
 one of two ISBN Group Identifiers for books published in Hong Kong.
 989 = 23 × 43, Extra strong Lucas pseudoprime
 one of two ISBN Group Identifiers for books published in Portugal

990s
990 = 2 × 32 × 5 × 11, sum of six consecutive primes (151 + 157 + 163 + 167 + 173 + 179), triangular number, Harshad number
best possible VantageScore credit score
991 = prime number, sum of five consecutive primes (191 + 193 + 197 + 199 + 211), sum of seven consecutive primes (127 + 131 + 137 + 139 + 149 + 151 + 157), Chen prime, lucky prime, prime index prime
992 = 25 × 31, pronic number, nontotient; number of eleven-dimensional exotic spheres.
country calling code for Tajikistan
993 = 3 × 331
country calling code for Turkmenistan
994 = 2 × 7 × 71, sphenic number, nontotient, number of binary words of length 13 with all distinct runs.
country calling code for Azerbaijan
995 = 5 × 199
country calling code for Georgia
Singapore fire brigade and emergency ambulance services hotline, Brunei Darussalam fire service emergency number
996 = 22 × 3 × 83
country calling code for Kyrgyzstan
997 = largest three-digit prime number, strictly non-palindromic number. It is also a lucky prime.
998 = 2 × 499, nontotient, number of 7-node graphs with two connected components.
country calling code for Uzbekistan

999 = 33 × 37, Kaprekar number, Harshad number
In some parts of the world, such as the UK and Commonwealth countries, 999 (pronounced as nine, nine, nine) is the emergency telephone number for all emergency services 
999 was a London punk band active during the 1970s.

References

Integers